The 2008 Italian Athletics Championships was the 98th edition of the Italian Athletics Championships and were held in Cagliari.

Men

Women

References

External links 
Full results at FIDAL

Italian Athletics Championships
Athletics
Italian Athletics Outdoor Championships
Athletics competitions in Italy
Sport in Cagliari